Nitryl chloride is a volatile inorganic compound with formula ClNO2. At standard conditions it is a gas.

Formation
Nitryl chloride can be formed in the reaction of dinitrogen pentoxide with chlorides or hydrogen chloride:

N2O5 + 2HCl → 2ClNO2 + H2O

N2O5 + NaCl  → ClNO2 + NaNO3

This kind of reaction can occur in the Earth's atmosphere.

References

Nitro compounds
Nitrogen oxohalides
Nitrogen(V) compounds
Oxychlorides
Inorganic chlorine compounds